Hagström is a musical instrument manufacturer in Älvdalen, Dalecarlia, Sweden. Their original products were accordions that they initially imported from Germany and then Italy before opening their own facility in 1932. During the late 1950s, the company started making electric guitars and later amplifiers. The early guitars were heavily influenced by the accordion production and had a special look and feel. Hagström were the first company to mass-produce 8 string bass guitars as well as the first to build a guitar/synthesizer hybrid (Swede Patch 2000). The company ceased production in 1983. In 2004 the brand was resurrected and is now in production in China. In 2008 Hagström expanded their line of products and launched their own line of basses including a re-issue of their famous Hagström H8, an 8 string bass.

Accordions 1925 to 1970
Albin Hagström began importing accordions from Germany and Italy in 1925 and founded "Firma Albin Hagström". Albin expanded his business with shops in Sweden, Norway and Denmark and in 1932 he started manufacturing accordions himself in Älvdalen. In 1936, Hagström hired two Italian accordion builders who helped to update and streamline the manufacturing process. In 1939 Hagström started to establish themselves in USA by opening "Hagstrom Music Company Inc." in Rockefeller Center in New York as well as "Albin Hagstrom Inc." in Jamestown. However, in 1940 the launch was canceled due to World War II and the people hired to run the company disappeared with the company's funds. In 1946 Sven Hillring was sent over from Sweden to oversee a new launch of the new accordion factory in Jamestown, which was in business until 1949.

Back in Sweden the brand continued to grow throughout the 1940s and 1950s and at one time had a total of forty-eight shops in northern Europe. In 1953 the accordion production reached its peak with 15,000 units being built. At this time the company also started a number of accordion schools; it is estimated that over 70,000 people have attended these schools. Founder Albin Hagström died in 1952 at the age 47 and was succeeded by Erik Wisén. In 1968 the Super Cromatic was introduced which came to be the last accordion built, with the last one made in 1970.

In 1984 the company returned to its roots by once again importing accordions from Germany and Italy. The shops were sold, and employees were encouraged to venture out on their own, which resulted in two new companies in Älvdalen. Musitech was started by Hagstrom and sold to Rolf Lindhamn, who was the official Swedish retailer of Aria and Guild guitars. Per-Åke Olsson who participated in the development of the Super Swede founded Amtech which is producing PA systems and light rigs as well as computer equipment. The original "AB Albin Hagström" company still exists to this day and still owns many of the facilities in Sweden, Norway and Denmark.

Hagströms Accordions 
 1930s
 Excellent - The first accordions manufactured by Hagström..
 Granesso
 1940s
 389-31
 "Granesso 70
 Accordia Superior and Extra
 1950s
 Castello" and Minor - Built in Italy.
 Skandia
 773 and 813
 Constellation, Marita and Rosella
 Master 4/5
 Rigoletto I, II and III
 Rosita I and II
 Consul Maestro and Maestoso
 Constella II and Estrella
 Accordia Royal
 "Diana" Prod in Älvdalen ca 1955-1960. 
 1960s
 Walter Special 40 - Named after Andrew Walter, well-known contemporary accordionist.
 Super Cromatic - The last accordion manufactured, widely considered to be one of the best accordions available.

Guitars: 1958 to 1983

In 1958, Swedish-based Hagström started manufacturing electric guitars, being one of the first to produce the instrument professionally outside of the United States. The early Hagström Deluxe solid body guitars featured a distinctive sparkle and pearloid celluloid finish that was previously used on their line of accordions. Soon Hagström expanded their line-up of guitars to include hollow bodies like the Viking and the Jimmy. In 1961 the first line of Hagström basses was available to the public, this eventually came to include the groundbreaking 8 string bass.

Models of electric guitar included the Hagström 1, the H series (h II, h III, h II N), the Swede (Originally called The Hagström LP, or Les Paul, due to the instrument's resemblance to the popular Les Paul manufactured by Gibson Guitars), the Super Swede, the Impala, the Corvette (called the Condor in the US), the Viking, the Swede Patch 2000 (one of the first synthesizer guitars) and the Jimmy (named for Jimmy D'Aquisto, a respected New York luthier brought in by Hagström to design the guitar). Basses include The Swede Bass and the Hagström H8 - the first ever mass-produced eight stringed bass guitar, which found fame when used by the likes of Noel Redding, Jimi Hendrix, Mike Rutherford, and others. Another innovation was the H-Expander Truss Rod, which gives the neck additional strength allowing it to be unusually thin. Thus the action can be set lower than guitar necks built with traditional truss rods.

Beside their line of instruments Hagström also produced amplifiers, speakers, effects units, guitar strings and mixing consoles, which were used by ABBA on their first world tour. A very small run of lap steels, banjos and mandolins were also built but are rare to come across. In 1962 Albin's son, Karl-Erik Hagström returned from working five years in the US with establishing their Line O guitars. In 1967 he took over as CEO of the company. In their native Sweden, the company became well known not only for selling music hardware, but also for "teach-yourself" books and mail courses on electric guitar, bass, keyboards etc., learning tools that deliberately took in a rock and pop repertory, chord analysis and tuning apart from teaching how to read music. By recognizing the electric guitar as an instrument in its own right, and not just an amped-up version of the acoustic and by accepting the new repertory, Hagström popularized  the instrumental skills of the new music outside of the networks associated with rock clubs, and record shops, and at  a time when rock music was barely ever being written about from a musical perspective.

Production ended for Swedish-made Hagströms in 1983 as the company were outpriced by other major guitar brands that had moved their stock production lines to Asia. Hagström did make some Japanese prototypes; however, they were not pleased with the workmanship and would rather close down the company than cheapen the brand. The interest in the original Hagström brand still has a cult following around the world and a Hagström Festival takes place in Älvdalen, Sweden around the first week of June every year since 2006.

Hagström Guitars

 Standard, DeLuxe and DeLuxe A, 1958–1962 - Sold in America under the name Goya (not to be confused with Goya guitars, acoustic guitars by Levin). Equipped with the Hagströms Speed-O-Matic fretboard, look similar to the Gibson Les Paul. Sometimes called The Glitter Guitars. DeLuxe A was nicknamed the Batman because of its unusual look.
 Kent, Kent I och Kent II, 1962–1966 - Sold in America as Hagström F-11, F-200 or F-300, and in England as Futurama. The first Hagström guitar with the "Tremar" tremolo system  as standard. Inspired by the Fender Stratocaster.
 Hagström Futurama Coronado Automatic, 1963. 200 built specially by Hagström to the requirements of Ben Davis - owner of the Selmer company in London.
 Automatic, Impala and Corvette, 1963–1967 - Automatic was a cross between the Impala and the Corvette. The Corvette was named the Condor in America. All models had a glued neck.
 Hagström I, II and III, 1964–1976 - Gibson SG-inspired body with a Fender-style headstock. Hagström II and III were sold in America as the F-200 and F-300. The later model H-IIN had the same body, but two humbucking pickups, and rotary knobs instead of slide switches. The H-IIN-OT lacked the tremolo tail.
 Viking, Viking 1, Viking II, Viking DeLuxe and Viking I N, 1965–1979 - Hagströms first semi-hollow guitar. With the Viking I N he pickups were changed from single-coils to humbuckers.
 Hagström Jimmy, 1969–1979 - Semihollow guitar designed by Jimmy D´Aquisto, available with a regular or oval F-hole.
 Swede and Super Swede, 1970–1983 - Last model to be manufactured in Älvdalen. Inspired by the Gibson Les Paul. Super Swede was originally named Swede DeLuxe, but the name was changed after being called the Super Swede in a music magazine.
 Scandi, 1976–1980 - Stratocaster-inspired model with three single coil pickups. Also called Hagström III and built in a small run for left-handed players.
 Swede Patch 2000, 1976–1979 - A hybrid between a guitar and a synthesizer, required a special technique to play and was very hard to play.
 Partner, 1979 - Like the later humbucker version of Hagström II, but with a wraparound bridge/tailpiece.
 Ultra Swede, 1983 - Produced in Japan to cut costs but didn't live up to Hagströms standards.

Hagström Bass Guitars 
 Hagström Standard and DeLuxe Bass, 1961 - Hagströms first bass. Based on the designs of their guitars and equipped with Hagström's Speed-O-Matic fretboard.
 Kent, 1962 - Sold in America as the Hagström FB.
 Coronado IV and VI, 1963 - available with 4 or 6 strings. also fitted with the Hagströms Speed-O-Matic fretboard.
 Concord and Concord De Luxe, 1965 – semi-hollow bass.
 Hagström II B, 1965
 Hagström H8, 1967 - The world's first 8 string bass.
 Hagström Jazz Bass, 1973–1977
 Hagström Scanbass, 1979 - Fretless bass.
 Super Swede Bass, 1980 - Last bass built by Hagström in Sweden.

Decoding Serial Numbers 

1.	Hagstrom used a 6 or 7digit serial number on production (1963 - 1983) electric guitar and bass models. 

2.	The first 3 digits of the serial number indicate the manufacturing Production Run number. The remainder of the number is the sequence number for that unit (guitar or bass) within the production run. The format is PPPNNNN where PPP is the production run number and NNN or NNNN is the sequence number within that production run. 

3.	Hagstrom did keep detailed records for each unit produced, and there is a book to that effect but not widely available. you may want to seek it out. Without the book you may be able to determine the year however.  

Here are some real-world examples: 

a.	Some serial numbers reveal a clear-cut result. For example, serial number 618324 is from the production run 618 which consisted of 1000 Hagstrom II guitars started and completed in 1964. Therefore, all units with a 618NNNN serial number are from the year 1964.

b.	However, others are less clear. For example, serial number 680873 is a Viking V-1 and the 873rd guitar made in production run 680. That run started in 1965 and completed in 1966. 1000 units were made in that run, so it is impossible with existing records to know if this guitar was actually made in 1965 or made in 1966. We know that this sequence number (873) is a high number in relation to the total of 1000 guitars produced in the run. We can therefore make the guess that it was most likely produced in 1966. The best that can be said in this instance is that the actual manufacture date is no earlier than 1965 and no later than 1966. 

4.	Serial numbers were etched on the guitar neck backing plate where the neck is joined to the body. There are instances where the serial number appeared on the input jack plate (seen on a Hagstrom Swede from 1973)as well. This may have been common and an alternative serial number location. 

5.	In 1975/76 the numbers “53” were added as a prefix to the serial number (53 PPPNNNN) and should be ignored for decoding purposes. 

6.	Production run numbers are in general sequential with some exceptions. In a real-world example: Production runs 706, 707, 708, 709, 711, 712, 713, 714, 715, 716, and 718 are verified to have all started in 1967. It can then be predicted that runs 710 and 717 also started in 1967, if those runs occurred. The likelihood of the start date being consistent relative to those adjacent to it is considered high but caution should be used as this may not always have been true.

7.	Any serial number beginning with the digits "500" indicates the model is a prototype.

Partial Serial Number List

Guitars: 2004 to present day
As of 2004, Hagström has been reopened for the international market being distributed by "Tricor AB". They are marketing new versions of a great number of the more famous models from Sweden. The official Hagström design team have taken certain liberties with the designs and made some improvements and other deviations from the original Swedish designs. Hagström has again started the production of more exclusive Hagstrom guitars within Europe, which have been specially developed to reproduce the sounds of the originals. These models are called the Northen Series.

Current Hagström Guitars

 Deluxe D2H and Deluxe-F D2F. The Deluxe models come with two humbuckers and are single cutaway guitars. They have simple wiring with two potentiometers for master volume and tone control. These models were some of the first made when manufacturing resumed in 2004; however, they are no longer in production. The shape and dimensions of the D2H appear to have been based on that of the early [1958-62] pearloid-covered models such as the Standard 80 [pictured].
 Deuce and Deuce-F. The Deuce models come with two humbuckers and are dual cutaway guitars, where Hagstrom claims that these are siblings based upon the Super Swede model. Both guitars have independent push/pull tone pots for coil splitting each individual pickup.
Fantomen. The Fantomen models come with two humbuckers and are asymmetrical in design closely resembling the Gibson RD. The models come with two volume and two push/pull tone pots. The Fantomen was designed in collaboration with Ghost (Swedish band).
RetroScape. Hagstrom’s RetroScape Series consist of authentically recreated guitars from Hagstrom's history. The intention being to bring modern playability to these great designs without compromising any of the retro-vibe.  There are two ranges of guitars: the 3-pickup Condor (& its 2-pickup sister the Impala) and the 3-pickup H-III (along with 2-pickup H-II).  All of these feature modified headstocks from the 1960s originals as well as an upgraded bridge and re-engineered “Vintage Tremar” vibrato for functional improvement.
 UltraLux Series XL-5 and Ultralux Series XL-2. The XL-5 comes with two humbuckers and one single coil pickup, the XL-2 is identical except it lacks the single coil pickup. Equipped with the FCS-2 bridge system.
 UltraLux Series Ultra Swede. Comes with a coil tap switch that gives the humbucker pickups a single coil sound when tapped. Also includes "Custom 62" pickups being considered a more aggressive and hot set of pickups.  Two Special Edition models were manufactured.  One was for the Nitro company who manufactures snowboards and the other for Absolut vodka.
 Select Super Swede, Select Swede and Select Ultra Swede. Identical except for the Select Super Swede's longer neck (25,5" compared to 24,75") and the Select Ultra Swede is available with Custom 58 uncovered pickups.
 Super Swede  - Also offered as Tremar Super Swede, and Tremar Super Swede P-90 (equipped with 3 H-90-S pickups (N/RW/N)(S- Stands for "Spiced" which are specially voiced to provide more of an accentuated Single coil sound)) and a 6-way rotary switch. Hagstrom's "Tremar unit" is Hagstrom's special designed vintage "Tremar" tremolo system which is known to be one of the best "Vintage" type of tremolo units on the market.
 Swede  . Also offered as Tremar Swede, and Swede-SE using Hagstrom's unique H-90-S pickups.
 F-20 and the F-200. The F-200 lacks the tremolo that comes with the F-20 as well as having a set mahogany neck compared to the maple bolt-on neck of the F-20.
The F-20 has a one piece 45mm basswood body and uses the FCS-1 tremolo system. The F-200 has a 40mm contoured Mahogany body.
 F200P . Available with two H-90 Single coils and FCS-1 tremolo as standard.
 Viking, Viking II and Viking IIP. A reissue of the Hagström Viking, the Viking and the Deluxe are identical except for the Deluxe having a flamed top, different inlays on the fingerboard and a different F-hole. The Viking II is a model which uses a bolt-on neck opposed to the Viking which uses a set neck.
 HJ-500  and the HJ-600 . A reissue of the original Hagström Jimmy. Tremar HJ-500 using Hagstrom's special designed vintage "Tremar" tremolo system on this model, being a popular choice for rockabilly guitarists, looking for a dependable tremolo unit.
 HL-550. Semi-hollow body with a single floating humbucker pickup.
 HJ-800 . A reissue of the original Hagström Jimmy, equipped with a Solid Spruce top, Custom 58 pickups, and a 25" scale length.

Current Hagström Bass guitars 
 HB-8. Re-issue of the original 8 string bass.
 HB-4.
Viking Bass.
 FXB-200, -210, -220, -520, and -530
 Beluga II, IIF, III, and IIIF

Hagströms as collectibles
Ever since 1983, when original production stopped, Hagströms have been sought-after collectors' items. Pat Smear is known for having one of the largest Hagström collections in America and reportedly claimed that Hagströms are the most roadworthy guitars he's ever used. The world's largest collection of Hagström guitars was previously owned by Arne Johansson in Östersund, Sweden and consisted of more than 80 Hagström guitars plus a number amplifiers and other instruments and Hagström products. The entire collection was bought by the publicly owned museum of the Dalarna province, that owned a smaller collection of instruments, on 4 May 2012. Their collection now consists of more than 100 Hagström guitars.

The red Viking II that Elvis Presley used on Elvis Presley's '68 Comeback Special was sold in the early nineties for more than $50,000 and was on display at the Museum of Modern Art in New York. 
A 1981 Super Swede with custom blue and yellow graphics was sold for 60,100 Swedish kronor (approx. $8,850 USD), making it one of the most expensive Hagströms ever sold.

The Guitar Collection features a rare Hagström Futurama Coronado automatic.

Notable users

 Elvis Presley - 68 Comeback Special
 Elias Bender Rønnenfelt - Iceage
 Kurt Cobain - Nirvana
 David Bowie - Rebel Rebel music video, and in various bands.
 Pat Smear - Nirvana, Foo Fighters, and the Germs
 Aaron North - The Icarus Line, Nine Inch Nails and Jubilee (band)
 Noel Redding - The Jimi Hendrix Experience
 Joe Walsh - Eagles, James Gang, Barnstorm
 Rutger Gunnarsson - ABBA, played and designed the Hagström Super Swede Bass
 Stu Mackenzie - King Gizzard and the Lizard Wizard
 Björn Ulvaeus - ABBA
 Frank Zappa - The Mothers of Invention and Captain Beefheart
 Dweezil Zappa- Zappa Plays Zappa
 Bob Hardy - Franz Ferdinand
 Nick McCarthy - Franz Ferdinand
 Jimi Hendrix - The Jimi Hendrix Experience
 Luis Alberto Spinetta
 Ryan Ross - Panic! at the Disco and The Young Veins
 Josh Homme - Kyuss, Queens of the Stone Age and Them Crooked Vultures
 Frances McKee - The Vaselines
 Kevin Parker - Tame Impala
 Daryl Stuermer - Jean-Luc Ponty
 Doc Forrester - Archie Bell & the Drells- and many more

 Nameless Ghoul - Ghost

Media
 Hagström - Allt i musik. Swedish documentary film, first broadcast in 2004 by the K Special television show on SVT2 in Sweden.

References

External links 

 Official Hagstrom guitars
 Hagström instruments – Swedish Spare Part website (For Vintage Hagstrom Guitars)

Musical instrument manufacturing companies of Sweden
Guitar manufacturing companies
Bass guitar manufacturing companies
Swedish companies established in 1925